Tres de Mayo Airport  is an airport serving the city of Puerto Asís in the Putumayo District of Colombia.

Runway 01 has a  displaced threshold. The  Puerto Asis non-directional beacon (Ident: SIS) is located on the field.

Airlines and destinations

See also
Transport in Colombia
List of airports in Colombia

References

External links 
OpenStreetMap - Puerto Asis
OurAirports - Puerto Asis
SkyVector - Puerto Asis
FallingRain - Puerto Asis Airport

Airports in Colombia
Buildings and structures in Putumayo Department